The 4th constituency of Martinique is a French legislative constituency in the Martinique département, currently represented by Jean-Philippe Nilor of Péyi-A.

Election results

2022

 
 
|-
| colspan="8" bgcolor="#E9E9E9"|
|-

2017

2012

2007

Sources and references
 Official results of French elections from 1998: 

4